The 1906 Tempe Normal Owls football team was an American football team that represented Tempe Normal School (later renamed Arizona State University) as an independent during the 1906 college football season. In their eighth and final season under head coach Frederick M. Irish, the Owls compiled a 0–2 record and were outscored by their opponents by a combined total of 22 to 6.

Schedule

References

Tempe Normal
Arizona State Sun Devils football seasons
College football winless seasons
Tempe Normal Owls football